Ham Sung-min is a South Korean actor. He is known for his roles in dramas such as Sweet Revenge, Save the Family, Gangnam Beauty, Tunnel and All of Us Are Dead. He also appeared in movies such as Psychokinesis, The Sound of a Flower, Confession, The Battleship Island and Missing.

Filmography

Television series

Film

References

External links 
 
 

1998 births
Living people
21st-century South Korean male actors
South Korean male television actors
South Korean male film actors